Brachylia kwouus is a moth in the family Cossidae. It is found in Tanzania.

References

Natural History Museum Lepidoptera generic names catalog

Cossinae
Moths described in 1898
Moths of Africa